Benjamin Levin (April 11, 1927 – April 13, 2020) was a Jewish partisan during World War II, the last surviving member of the Avengers group led by Abba Kovner. After the war, he joined the Irgun, and was one of the surviving crew members of the Altalena ship. In 1967, he immigrated to the United States.

World War II 
Levin was born in Vilna, then part of the Second Polish Republic. He was the son of Chaim Levin, a local merchant and gourmet food shop owner. When it became unsafe, the family returned to Vilna and lived in Vilna Ghetto. In 1943, when he was 16 years old, Levin and his older brother Shmuel joined the Avengers (Nokmim) partisan group of Abba Kovner. During the war, the Avengers impaired railways, destroyed train cars, cut communication wires, bombed bridges, and injured and killed Nazis. His small stature allowed him to hide, spy, scout, and escape detection easily. His brother was killed during one of the raids though circumstances are not known.

He and other Avengers joined the Red Army when it captured Vilnius in 1944. His parents survived the Holocaust but were later killed by neighbors when they tried to reclaim their home. He submitted his testimony of the Holocaust to the United States Holocaust Memorial Museum. He was interviewed by Steven Spielberg who dubbed Levin "the Forrest Gump of Jewish history."

Irgun Party 
He was imprisoned by the NKVD for helping Jews to illegally immigrate to Palestine and his involvement in the Irgun, a Zionist paramilitary organization. He spent a year in a Siberian Gulag. After his release he hitchhiked to Italy where he rejoined the party. He studied mechanical engineering and was assigned to the engine room of Altalena. In June 1948, during the confrontation with the Israel Defense Forces, Levin fled the burning ship and settled in Israel.

Later life 
In 1967, Levin moved to New York with his family and became a mechanic for the MTA and a gas station owner. Due to multiple fake papers, Levin forgot his real birthday and chose to celebrate it during the Passover. He was married to Sara, a Hungarian Holocaust survivor. They had two children. Levin frequently spoke to high school students about the Holocaust. Levin died on April 13, 2020, from COVID-19 at a nursing home in Westchester County, New York.

References 

1927 births
2020 deaths
Vilna Ghetto inmates
Jewish partisans
Irgun members
Deaths from the COVID-19 pandemic in New York (state)
Military personnel from Vilnius
Lithuanian Jews
Soviet emigrants to Israel
Israeli emigrants to the United States
American people of Lithuanian-Jewish descent
Jewish Gulag detainees